Otrada is a rural locality (a selo) in Kipchak-Askarovsky Selsoviet, Alsheyevsky District, Bashkortostan, Russia. The population was 208 as of 2010. There are 3 streets.

Geography 
Otrada is located 30 km southeast of Rayevsky (the district's administrative centre) by road. Balandino is the nearest rural locality.

References 

Rural localities in Alsheyevsky District